Llebredo is a parish in the municipalities of Boal, Coaña, and El Franco, within the province and autonomous community of Asturias, in northern Spain. 

The population is 98 (INE 2007). The postal codes are 33719 and 33756.

Villages
 Brañamayor
 Coba
 Llebredo

References

Parishes in Boal
Parishes in Coaña
Parishes in El Franco